The Langeberg Range is a mountain range in the Western Cape province of South Africa. Its highest peak is Keeromsberg at 2,075 m that lies 15 km northeast of the town of Worcester. Some of the highest peaks of the range are located just to the north of Swellendam, in a subrange known as the Clock Peaks whose highest point is the 1,710 m high Misty Point. Local lore states one can tell the time by means of the shadows cast by the seven summits of the Clock Peaks.

Etymology
The name is Dutch and means "long mountain"

Physiography and geology

The range runs roughly NW/SE in its western part and in an east-west direction in its mid and eastern section and is approximately 250 km long, from Worcester, past Robertson, Montagu, Swellendam, Heidelberg and Riversdale to the proximity of George.

The Langeberg's most westerly point is located 5 km east of the town of Worcester; the range ends some 20 km North of Mossel Bay in the east. The open plains of the Little Karoo border the north of the mountain range, while to the south lies the Agulhas Plain and the Overberg wheatbelt.

The Langeberg Range is composed mostly of Table Mountain Sandstone and the range is part of the Cape Fold Belt.

Ecology

On the southern slopes of the range mountain fynbos can be found, with Afromontane forest patches found in deep secluded gorges, while on the drier northern slopes karroid scrub is found.

Protected areas
There are the following protected areas along the range:
The Marloth Nature Reserve, in the area where the highest peaks are found
The Boosmansbos Wilderness Area, which includes the Grootvadersbosch Nature Reserve near Barrydale
The Garcia State Forest

Mountain passes
The range is traversed by four mountain passes, from west to east, they are:
 Cogmanskloof Pass, linking Montagu with Ashton.
 Tradouws Pass, linking Barrydale with Swellendam and Heidelberg
 Garcia's Pass, linking Riversdale and Ladismith, Western Cape
 Cloetes Pass, linking Mossel Bay with Ladismith, Western Cape

See also 
Geography of South Africa
List of mountain ranges of South Africa
Western Cape

References

Mountain ranges of the Western Cape